Republic of Dominica may refer to:

 Dominican Republic, a country located on the island of Hispaniola, in the Greater Antilles, in the Caribbean
 Commonwealth of Dominica, an island country, in the Lesser Antilles, in the Caribbean